Satyendra Prasanna Sinha, 1st Baron Sinha, KCSI, PC, KC, (24 March 1863 – 4 March 1928) was a prominent British Indian lawyer and statesman. He was the first Governor of Bihar and Orissa, first Indian Advocate-General of Bengal, first Indian to become a member of the Viceroy's Executive Council and the first Indian to become a member of the British ministry. He is sometimes also referred as Satyendra Prasanno Sinha or Satyendra Prasad Sinha.

Early life and education
Sinha was born on 24 March 1863 in Raipur, Birbhum in Bengal Presidency, British India (now in West Bengal, India). His ancestor, Lalchand Dey, a businessman, came from Midnapur in southern Bengal to Birbhum in south-western Bengal, sailing up the Ajoy, to Raipur, which is just south of Bolpur. Here he set up his new home, buying the zamindari of Raipur from the Chaudhuri of the village. His father, the zamindar of Raipur, belonged to the Uttar Rarhi Kayastha sreni, a Bengali Kayastha caste. Sinha completed his early education from Birbhum Zilla School at Suri and then obtained a scholarship to carry on with his higher studies at Presidency College, Calcutta, then affiliated to the University of Calcutta, in 1878. In 1881, he left his studies in India to study law in England. In England, a scholarship of £50 a year for four years enabled him to train at Lincoln's Inn where he studied Roman Law, Jurisprudence, Constitutional Law and International Law. Later, he also won the Lincoln's Inn scholarship of £100 for three years. In 1886 he returned to Calcutta as a barrister.

Career

After returning to India in 1886, Sinha established a successful legal practice in Calcutta. In 1903, Sinha became Standing Counsel to the Government of India overriding the claims of an English Barrister. He was the first Indian to be appointed as Advocate-General of Bengal in 1905, a post that was confirmed in 1908. His legal practice in 1908 was so lucrative that accepting government's invitation meant a cut in his annual income of £10,000. Sinha's first inclination was to turn down the viceroy's invitation, but Jinnah and Gokhale convinced him to accept the job. He also became the first Indian to enter the Viceroy's Executive Council in 1909. He was knighted in the New Year Honours on 1 January 1915. Sinha was elected President of the Indian National Congress in 1915 at the Bombay session of Congress.

In 1917, Sinha returned to England to work as an Assistant for Secretary of State, Edwin Samuel Montagu. Later, he also worked as a member of the Imperial War Cabinet and Conference along with the Maharaja of Bikaner, Ganga Singh following the outbreak of the First World War, and represented India in Europe's Peace Conference in 1919. In the same year, he was made Parliamentary Under-Secretary of State for India and also raised to the peerage as Baron Sinha of Raipur in the Presidency of Bengal. He became the first Indian member of the British House of Lords, taking his seat in February 1919. He was instrumental in passing of Government of India Act, 1919 through the House of Lords.

He returned to India in 1920 and was appointed as the first governor of the Province of Bihar and Orissa. His term as Governor did not last long and he served on this position for 11 months on grounds of bad health. In 1926, Sinha went back to England and joined the Judicial Committee of the Privy Council in London but bad health forced him to return to India.

Indian National Congress
Sinha was a member of the Indian National Congress from 1896 to 1919 - rising to become its president in 1915 at the Bombay session. He left Congress in 1919 along with other moderate members. At the Calcutta session of the Congress in 1896 - he brought a proposal that no ruler of any Indian State should be deposed without an open judicial trial.

Shantiniketan
Shantiniketan was originally a part of the ancestral zamindari of the Sinha family of Raipur, Birbhum. Satyendra Prasad Sinha donated for the construction of Sinha Sadan with a clock tower and bell. It was in this building that Oxford University conferred its honorary doctorate on the poet, Rabindranath Tagore.

Death
Sinha died on 4 March 1928 at Berhampore.

Personal life
He was married to Gobinda Mohini Mitra on 15 May 1880 at Mahata, Burdwan, Bengal. They had four sons and three daughters.

Styles
1863–1886: Satyendra Prasad Sinha
1886–1915: Satyendra Prasad Sinha, KC
1915-10 February 1919: Sir Satyendra Prasad Sinha, KC
10–19 February 1919: The Right Honourable Sir Satyendra Prasad Sinha, PC, KC
19 February 1919 – 1920: The Right Honourable The Lord Sinha, PC, KC
1920-1921: His Excellency The Right Honourable The Lord Sinha, PC, KC
1921–1928: The Right Honourable The Lord Sinha, KCSI, PC, KC

References

External links
Biographies:
 
Portraits at the National Portrait Gallery

1863 births
1928 deaths
Bengali Hindus
Politicians from Kolkata
West Bengal politicians
Presidency University, Kolkata alumni
University of Calcutta alumni
Barons in the Peerage of the United Kingdom
Indian peers
Bengali zamindars
Indian members of the Privy Council of the United Kingdom
Indian barristers
Knights Commander of the Order of the Star of India
Knights Bachelor
Indian Knights Bachelor
People from Birbhum district
Members of the Judicial Committee of the Privy Council
British politicians of Indian descent
19th-century Indian lawyers
20th-century Indian lawyers
19th-century Indian politicians
20th-century Indian politicians
English King's Counsel
Barons created by George V
Members of the Council of the Governor General of India